Don Camillo's Last Round (French: La grande bagarre de Don Camillo, Italian: Don Camillo e l'onorevole Peppone) is a 1955 French-Italian comedy film directed by Carmine Gallone and starring Fernandel, Gino Cervi and Leda Gloria. It was the third of five films featuring Fernandel as the Italian priest Don Camillo and his struggles with Giuseppe 'Peppone' Bottazzi, the Communist mayor of their rural town. The film had 5,087,231 admissions in France.

It was shot at the Cinecittà Studios in Rome and on location in Boretto and Brescello in Emilia-Romagna. The film's sets were designed by the art director Virgilio Marchi.

Plot
In the small town of Brescello, skirmishes are continuing between the parish priest Don Camillo and the Communist mayor Peppone Bottazzi. After staging a theft of Don Camillo's prized chickens in retribution for a political prank pulled by the priest, Peppone decides to enter the big time of politics by standing for national senator. Peppone has been assisted by a winsome young lady comrade sent from the big city to assist him, but the mayor's wife - suspecting more - complains to Don Camillo, who endeavours to remedy the threatened domestic breakdown.

Cast
 Fernandel as Don Camillo
 Gino Cervi as Giuseppe 'Peppone' Bottazzi
 Claude Sylvain as Clotilde
 Leda Gloria as La signora Bottazzi, moglie di Peppone
 Umberto Spadaro as Bezzi
 Memmo Carotenuto as Lo Spiccio
 Saro Urzì as Brusco, il parucchiere
 Guido Celano as Il maresciallo
 Luigi Tosi as Il prefetto
 Marco Tulli as Lo Smilzo
 Giovanni Onorato as Il Lungo

Sequel
Don Camillo: Monsignor (Italian: Don Camillo monsignore ma non troppo; French: Don Camillo Monseigneur) (1961)
Don Camillo in Moscow (Italian: Il compagno don Camillo; French: Don Camillo en Russie) (1965)
Don Camillo e i giovani d'oggi (French: Don Camillo et les contestataires; English translated: Don Camillo and the youth of today)  (1970) (unfinished film)

References

1955 comedy films
1955 films
Films about Catholic priests
Films based on Italian novels
Films based on works by Giovannino Guareschi
Films directed by Carmine Gallone
French comedy films
Italian comedy films
1950s Italian-language films
Films with screenplays by Age & Scarpelli
French satirical films
Italian satirical films
French political satire films
Italian political satire films
Films critical of communism
Films scored by Alessandro Cicognini
Films shot at Cinecittà Studios
Films with screenplays by René Barjavel
1950s Italian films
1950s French films